The Alegre River is a river in the state of Mato Grosso, Brazil.

Course

The Alegre River rises in the  Serra de Santa Bárbara State Park, created in 1997.
It flows in a generally northwest direction, receiving the Barbado River on its left, then flows north until it joins the Guaporé River from the left.

See also
List of rivers of Mato Grosso

References

Sources

Rivers of Mato Grosso